The discography of Australian recording artist Tim Omaji (known as Timomatic) consists of three studio albums, two extended plays, twenty-four singles (including one promotional single) and fourteen music videos. In May 2011, Omaji independently released his debut album, Welcome, which included the promotional single "Save the Dancefloor". Later that year, he signed a record deal with Sony Music Australia.

Omaji made his chart debut with "Set It Off", which reached number two on the ARIA Singles Chart and was certified four times platinum by the Australian Recording Industry Association. His second single "If Looks Could Kill" peaked at number eight and was certified double platinum. Omaji released his self-titled second album through Sony Music in August 2012, which debuted at number three on the ARIA Albums Chart. The album yielded two other top-twenty singles, "Can You Feel It" and "Incredible", which were certified platinum and gold, respectively. In 2013, Omaji released his fifth single "Parachute", which peaked at number three on the ARIA Singles Chart and was certified double platinum. In 2014, Omaji released music under his birth name Tim Omaji, before returning to Timomatic in 2017. In December, he released his second EP, Stamina

Albums

Studio albums

Extended plays

Singles

Promotional singles

Music videos

References

Discographies of Australian artists
Rhythm and blues discographies
Pop music discographies